Group W Films is a film production company which was an offshoot of Westinghouse Broadcasting Corporation.

Richard Pack was president from 1968 to 1972.

In December 1968 the company signed a contract with Australia's NLT Films to make two movies a year for five years, starting with Squeeze a Flower and Wake in Fright. They only made those two films with NLT.

Select filmography
The Violent Enemy (1967)
The Man Outside (1967)
Amsterdam Affair (1968)
The Limbo Line (1967)
Madigan's Millions (1968)
The Ravine (1969)
Taste of Excitement (1969)
Squeeze a Flower (1970)
One Day in the Life of Ivan Denisovich (1970)
Wake in Fright (1971)
Eagle in a Cage (1972)
Baxter! (1973)

References

External links

Group W Films at IMDb

Film production companies of Australia